Corona Theatre School (formerly Corona Academy) was founded in 1950 as a performing arts academy, operating in the region of west London. After the retirement of its owner, Rona Knight, it reopened as Ravenscourt Theatre School in 1989.

History

Corona Academy

Rona Knight
Rona Knight was born on 22 June 1911, the daughter of Leonard and Ellen Edith Speck Knight. She made her first stage appearance at age 11, at a Sunday School benefit. At the age of fourteen, Knight opened the Corona Dancing School, which proved successful. The dancing and singing group became known as the "Corona Babes" (later known as the "Corona Kids"), and in the early 1930s, began to perform professionally, all around the country. During the Second World War, Knight joined the hospital section of ENSA (Entertainments National Service Association). She chose the stage name Rona Brandon, and became well known as a BBC and recording soprano.

After World War II, Knight attended the Paris school of mime, dance and drama, and in 1950, opened the Corona Academy of Stage Training, in Sutton Lane, Chiswick. In 1955, the Corona Academy moved to larger facilities at 16 Ravenscourt Avenue, Hammersmith, whilst retaining its former premises in Chiswick. The school supplied the young cast for Lionel Bart's Oliver. The Corona Academy of Stage Training closed in 1989, following Miss Knight's retirement.

Ravenscourt Theatre School
Ravenscourt Theatre School was a stage school in London, for children aged 7 to 19 years old. The school was founded in 1989 by Robin Phillips, following the closure of the Corona Stage Academy, and the retirement of its principal, Rona Knight.

Robin ran the Corona agency for many years, and most of the traditions of Corona were incorporated into the Ravenscourt Theatre School, including the uniform and the teaching format, which had full academic studies in the morning, and vocational training in the afternoon. For much of its life, the school was situated near to Ravenscourt Park Underground station, in what is now the Ravenscourt Park Preparatory School. A similar school opened in Kew in 2009, and in 2010, became the Corona Theatre School, partially taking the name of the former school.

Corona Theatre School
In April 2010, the theatre school, opened as Ravenscourt, became known as Corona Theatre School. The school was a totally independent venture, and had no link with the former Corona Academy, although it did use a similar uniform. The school announced, in February 2013, that it would close.

Students either attended the school on a full-time, part-time or holiday school basis. The full-time school admitted both boys and girls, from the age of 11, and had a curriculum that pivoted around the performing arts. Students had the opportunity to study six GCSEs, and advanced training in all aspects of performing arts (Acting, Dance and Singing), and the opportunity to study towards a BTEC National Diploma in Performing Arts, at the age of 16.

Students were admitted to the school by audition, personal interview, and a written examination.

Notable former pupils 

Richard O'Sullivan
Susan George
Frazer Hines
Jill Haworth
Nicholas Lyndhurst
Keith Faulkner
Christian Holder
Mark Lester
Patsy Kensit
Nicola Stapleton
Ray Winstone
Érin Geraghty
Francesca Annis
Judy Geeson
Sally Geeson
Catherine Howe
Louise Clarke 
Nicholas Pinnock
Tina Charles
Larry Dann
Michele Dotrice
Dean Gaffney
Michael Redfern
Lisa Vanderpump
Helen Worth
Kathie Kay
Dennis Waterman
Carol White

Corona Management
Corona Theatre School ran a school agency, for full-time students, past students, and some actors and actresses from outside the school.

References

1940s establishments in England
1957 establishments in England
1989 disestablishments in England
2013 disestablishments in England
Drama schools in London
Defunct drama schools
Defunct schools in the London Borough of Hounslow
Defunct schools in the London Borough of Hammersmith and Fulham
Defunct universities and colleges in England
Educational institutions disestablished in 1989
Educational institutions disestablished in 2013
Educational institutions established in 1957
Educational institutions established in the 1940s